Oregon Route 27 is an Oregon state highway located in Deschutes County and Crook County.  OR 27 traverses the Crooked River Highway No. 14 of the Oregon state highway system.  Known as the Lower Crooked River Back Country Byway, OR 27 has the distinction of being one of the only state highways in Oregon which is partially paved: out of its  total length, an  stretch of the highway is gravel.

Route description 
OR 27 has its southern terminus at a junction with U.S. Route 20 at Brothers, east of Bend. It runs north, along the Crooked River, towards Prineville Reservoir and the city of Prineville. It terminates in Prineville at a junction with U.S. Route 26.  

The highway is commonly known as the Les Schwab Highway, as it serves a significant amount of freight traffic for the Les Schwab tire company, which is headquartered in Prineville. There have been numerous proposals over the years to pave the highway in its entirety; but no such projects have been undertaken due to lack of funding.

History
OR 27 used to extend further northwest to the town of Metolius, roughly following the present US 26.

Major intersections

References

External links 
ORoads: Oregon Route 27

027
Transportation in Deschutes County, Oregon
Transportation in Crook County, Oregon